Hasanabad-e Sheverin (also Romanized as Ḩasanābād-e Sheverīn and Ḩasanābād-e Shavarīn; also known as Ḩasanābād) is a village in Hegmataneh Rural District, in the Central District of Hamadan County, Hamadan Province, Iran. At the 2006 census, its population was 1,690, in 435 families.

References 

Populated places in Hamadan County